George Breinton (fl. 1413–1425) was an English politician.

Family
George Breinton was the son of the MP, William Breinton. He married a woman named Agnes at some point before November 1424. It is thought that the MP Thomas Breinton, was their son.

Career
He was Mayor of Hereford in 1430–4. He was a Member (MP) of the Parliament of England for Hereford in
May 1413, November 1414, March 1416, 1422, 1423 and 1425.

References

14th-century births
15th-century deaths
Mayors of Hereford
English MPs May 1413
English MPs November 1414
English MPs March 1416
English MPs 1422
English MPs 1423
English MPs 1425